Izidor Papo  (31 December 1913 – 14 October 1996) was a surgeon, general, military medical chief and academician.

Papo was a Sephardi Jew born in Ljubuški, Austria-Hungary (present-day Bosnia and Herzegovina). He finished high school in Mostar in 1932. Papo enrolled in the Medical faculty of the University of Zagreb on which he graduated on time with a perfect 10.0 record and then worked as a doctor at the state hospital in Sarajevo up to 1941.

Following the Axis powers' invasion of Yugoslavia, he joined the national liberation movement in 1941 and the partisan army in 1942 as doctor of the Mostar battalion, head of the 3rd division and partisan army supreme command surgical staff. He became a member of the Communist Party in June 1943. He graduated from the military medical academy in Leningrad in 1947 and became chief army surgeon and head of the surgical department of the army medical academy in Belgrade.

After the war, Papo turned to heart, lung and respiratory system surgery. His greatest achievements were in heart surgery. He performed 2,000 open heart operations and gave 400 of his patients artificial heart valves. He was elected as assistant professor in 1950, an associate professor in 1953 and professor in 1956. He was also promoted to general-colonel of the Yugoslav Army's medical unit in 1975.

Between 1963-66 he served as Surgical Section's President. That period saw very intensive work by the Section. He invited prominent surgeons from abroad to hold lectures at the Section's meetings. He became a correspondent member of the Serbian Academy of Sciences and Arts (SANU) in 1961 and a regular member in 1968.

He was a correspondent member of the academy of Bosnia and Herzegovina and Peru, a member of the French surgical academy and many international associations. He won the AVNOJ (the Antifascistic Council for the People's Liberation of Yugoslavia) and Belgrade October awards. He received a number of Yugoslav and foreign decorations. Papo published 217 works in extenso, 13 of which abroad.

Later years
Papo served over 30 years as chief surgeon of YPA. He retired in 1982 and died on 14 October 1996, aged 82, and was buried in the Jewish Cemetery in Belgrade.

Family
Papo's wife Anastasia, nicknamed Asija (1922-2009) was a Red Army nurse. She was Russian and Papo's third wife. They were childless.

External links
 Profile, whonamedit.com
 Profile, hirurskasekcija.org.rs

1913 births
1996 deaths
People from Ljubuški
Bosnia and Herzegovina Sephardi Jews
Austro-Hungarian Sephardi Jews
Jewish physicians
Jews in the Yugoslav Partisans
School of Medicine, University of Zagreb alumni
Generals of the Yugoslav People's Army
Yugoslav Partisans members
Place of death missing